The Deputy Prime Minister of Serbia (literally translated as Vice President of the Government of Serbia), is the official Deputy of the Prime Minister of Serbia.

According to convention, one deputy position is allocated to each junior partner in the ruling coalition, being ranked according to the size of their respective parties.

History of the office
The office of the Deputy Prime Minister of Serbia was established on 11 February 1991, during the government of Dragutin Zelenović. It was initially held by four people: Slobodan Prohaska, Velimir Radivojević, Nikola Stanić and Jovan Zebić. Since then, the office was usually held simultaneously by several people at the same time (in the government of Zoran Đinđić there were eight Deputy Prime Ministers at one point). Also, Deputy Prime Ministers may or may not combine the post with another government portfolio.

The current Deputy Prime Ministers, by date of assuming office, are namely: Maja Gojković (since 28 October 2020), Ivica Dačić (since 26 October 2022), Siniša Mali (since 26 October 2022) and Miloš Vučević (since 26 October 2022).

List of deputy prime ministers
Political Party:

See also
 Government of Serbia

References

External links
 Government of Serbia
 Serbian ministries, etc – Rulers.org

Government of Serbia
Deputy Prime Ministers
Serbia
Deputy Prime Ministers